Christine Rose may refer to:

Christine M. Rose (born 1969), American author
Christine Rose (politician), New Zealand politician
Cristine Rose (born 1951), American actress
Christine Brooke-Rose (1923–2012), British writer and literary critic
Christine Rose (dredge), a mining dredge seen on the reality television series Bering Sea Gold